Faith in Strangers is the third studio album by English electronic musician Andy Stott. It was released on 18 November 2014 by Modern Love. The album received critical acclaim, and the title track "Faith in Strangers" was given Best New Track and placed at number 81 on Pitchfork's list of the 100 best tracks of 2014. As with Stott's previous album Luxury Problems, Faith in Strangers also incorporates vocals from his former piano teacher, Alison Skidmore.

Accolades

Track listing

Charts

References

2014 albums
Andy Stott albums
Modern Love Records albums